Sunbeam Motor Car Company Limited was a British automobile manufacturer with its works at Moorfields in Blakenhall, a suburb of Wolverhampton in Staffordshire, now West Midlands. Its Sunbeam name had been registered by John Marston in 1888 for his bicycle manufacturing business. Sunbeam motor car manufacture began in 1901. The motor business was sold to a newly incorporated Sunbeam Motor Car Company Limited in 1905 to separate it from Marston's pedal bicycle business; Sunbeam motorcycles were not made until 1912.

In-house designer Louis Coatalen had an enthusiasm for motor racing accumulated expertise with engines. Sunbeam manufactured their own aero engines during the First World War and 647 aircraft to the designs of other manufacturers. Engines drew Sunbeam into Grand Prix racing and participation in the achievement of world land speed records.

In spite of its well-regarded cars and aero engines, by 1934 a long period of particularly slow sales had brought continuing losses. Sunbeam was unable to repay money borrowed for ten years in 1924 to fund its Grand Prix racing programme, and a receiver was appointed. There was a forced sale, and Sunbeam was picked up by the Rootes brothers. Manufacture of Sunbeam's now old-fashioned cars did not resume under the new owners, but Sunbeam trolleybuses remained in production.

Rootes had intended to sell luxury cars under the Sunbeam name, but almost four years after their purchase, in 1938, the two brothers instead chose to add the name Sunbeam to their Talbot branded range of Rootes designs calling them Sunbeam-Talbots. In 1954 they dropped the word Talbot, leaving just Sunbeam.

Sunbeam continued to appear as a marque name on new cars until 1976. It was then used as a model name, firstly for the Chrysler Sunbeam from 1977 to 1979, and, following the takeover of Chrysler Europe by PSA Group, for the Talbot Sunbeam from 1979 through to its discontinuation in 1981.

Ownership

John Marston

John Marston, the London-educated son of a sometime mayor of Ludlow and landowner, had been apprenticed to Edward Perry, tinplate-works master and twice mayor of Wolverhampton. In 1859 aged 23 Marston bought two other tinplate manufacturers in Bilston, four miles away, and set himself up on his own account. On Perry's death Marston bought his Jeddo Works in Paul Street Wolverhampton, left Bilston and continued Perry's business.

An avid cyclist he established his Sunbeamland Cycle Factory in 1897 in his Paul Street premises manufacturing and assembling pedal bicycles he branded Sunbeam. His Sunbeam trademark was registered in 1893. In 1895 a company, John Marston Limited, was incorporated and took ownership of John Marston's business. The Sunbeam trademark was registered for motor-cars in 1900.

Rugby-educated Thomas Cureton 1863–1921 began as his apprentice then became Marston's right-hand man in the cycle works and the cautious advocate of a motor-car venture. Their board of directors did not favour it but Marston and Cureton continued their project. Between 1899 and 1901 Sunbeam produced a number of experimental cars driven about Wolverhampton but none was offered for sale. In late 1900 they announced the purchase in Blakenhall of "a large area of land in Upper Villiers Street for the erection of works for the manufacture of cars" alongside the premises of Marston's Villiers Engineering business. The first announcement of their new autocar was on 22 September 1900 issue of The Autocar but no full description was provided to the public until February 1901. It would be supplied with a 2-seater body on a channel steel frame powered by a 4-horsepower horizontal engine with electric ignition intended to run at 700 rpm and have two forward speeds and reverse using belt drive to differential gears on the live axle. Dimensions: weight 10 cwt, overall measurements 84 inches by 57 inches.

Cyclecar
The first production car branded Sunbeam was not Marston and Cureton's but a car designed and developed by a young architect, Maxwell Mabberly-Smith, powered by a single-cylinder 2 horsepower De Dion engine. Described as a "sociable" it carried two passengers sitting close together facing the roadside from above a central belt-drive. To begin with they faced opposite roadsides. This layout provided propinquity while maintaining propriety. Their driver at his tiller sat behind them his body facing the opposite roadside. Wheels were arranged in a diamond formation. They used a frame like a motorised quadracycle version of Starley's Coventry Rotary and were to be referred to by The Automotor Journal as "the curiously light vehicles with which their (Sunbeam) name has for some time been associated". The Sunbeam Mabley was a limited success, several hundred sold in 1901 and 1902 at £130. More stock was still in the Sunbeam catalogue in early 1904 with the following specification: single cylinder 74 x 76 mm. 327 cc engine designed to run at 1,800 rpm, 2-speed gearbox, central wheels driven by belt then chain drives from the differential. Weight 4 cwt. Price £120

Motorcar

At the annual Stanley Cycle Show in November 1902 Sunbeam, thoroughly approved by the magazine's correspondent, displayed beside more Mableys a 12-horsepower four-cylinder car with the engine beneath a bonnet at the front, camshaft within the "crank chamber", a four-speed gearbox and all four artillery wheels of the same size fitted with pneumatic tyres. Price 500 guineas or £525. Listed in February 1904 its specification was: four cylinders 80 × 120 mm. 1527 cc engine designed to run at 1,000 rpm, four-speed gearbox, rear wheels driven by chain drives from the differential. Weight 16 cwt. Price £512.

In February 1904 the 12-horsepower car was given a six-cylinder 16-horsepower stablemate. Like the 12 the new engine was designed to give its full power at what were even then considered low engine speeds. Particular note was made that special attention had once more been paid to further controlling the airflow beneath the car's apron and the chassis to reduce that bane of passengers' comfort, the car's disturbance of dust on the road. The new car also featured chain cases so the chains ran in oil, were rendered almost silent and were protected from dirt.

Thomas Pullinger
London-born Thomas Charles Willis Pullinger (1866–1945) joined Sunbeam in 1902. He had repaired, then made bicycles, and then in 1891 was sent by Humber to France for Humber's joint venture with Gladiator but Humber struck difficulties and Pullinger stayed in France with Alexandre Darracq as Darracq's designer and personal assistant. He moved on as works manager to other French firms, designing perhaps the first small car and certainly designing the first water-cooled cylinder head. Very keen to design and build his own car, he moved back to England and arrived at Sunbeam in Wolverhampton on a motor-quadracycle he had built himself. He prepared a report for the Sunbeam directors and delivered it on 11 November 1902. His first recommendation was that Sunbeam should buy-in a car from an established firm, then as sales built-up, buy them without certain components which would instead be made by Sunbeam until all that was bought in would be an engine. The report concluded with his advice that the cars should be supplied to Sunbeam by Berliet. He also advised the remaining stock of Mabley cars should be sold off as quickly as possible. A decision was made to sell shares in the company to the general public. Some of the board approved because they could see much growth ahead, some only because they wanted other people to come in to cut back on their own risk. On 31 January 1905 the architect signed the plans for the new motorcar buildings on the land in Upper Villiers Street.

Sunbeam Motor Car Company
In January 1905, the Sunbeam Motor Car Company Ltd was formed to purchase and remove motor cars and their Villiers Street Works from the rest of the John Marston business which retained Sunbeam Cycles. Six years later after several further issues of shares to provide capital for greater expansion there was a (technically) public offer of ordinary and preference shares to Sunbeam agents and their customers representing a small part of the company's capital. Twelve months later in January 1912 its shares were formally listed on the London Stock Exchange and Sunbeam became a public listed company.

Louis Coatalen

The Breton car designer, Louis Coatalen, joined Sunbeam from Hillman-Coatalen in 1909, and became chief designer. He soon reorganised production so almost all parts were built in-house instead of relying on outside suppliers with their variable quality. He quickly introduced his first design, the Sunbeam 14/20, their first to use a shaft-driven rear axle. It was upgraded in 1911 with a slightly larger engine and rebranded 16/20.

Coatalen also designed a number of passenger cars, notably the Sunbeam 12–16. By 1911 Sunbeam were building about 650 cars a year and were regarded as a substantial motor manufacturer. Wolseley sold 3,000 cars of similar quality in 1913. Ford sold 6,000 Model Ts that same year assembled at Trafford Park, Manchester. In 1914 Ford switched on Britain's first moving assembly line for car production and it began its run at a rate of 21 cars an hour.

First World War

Aero engines
In 1912 they began to make aircraft engines introducing a series of engines that were not a commercial success. Coatalen seemed to believe the proper solution was a bespoke design for an aircraft designer's requirements instead of designing and producing a successful engine to let the aircraft designers build their aircraft around it. Sunbeam's designs included the troublesome V8 Sunbeam Arab, which was ordered in quantity in 1917 but suffered from continual vibration and reliability problems and only saw limited service and the more successful V12 Sunbeam Cossack. Meanwhile, Coatalen continued to experiment with ever-more odd designs such as the star-layout Sunbeam Malay, which never got beyond a prototype, the air-cooled Sunbeam Spartan and the diesel-powered Sunbeam Pathan. However Sunbeam was successful with the introduction of newer manufacturing techniques and became one of the first to build aluminium single-block engines, a design that would not become common until the 1930s.

Vehicles and aircraft
During the First World War Sunbeam built trucks and ambulances. It also participated in the Society of British Aircraft Constructors pool which shared aircraft designs with anyone that could build them. In this role Sunbeam produced 15 Short Bombers powered by their own Sunbeam Gurkha engines, 20 Short Type 827s, 50 Short 310s, and others including Avro 504 trainers; they even designed their own Sunbeam Bomber, which lost to a somewhat simpler Sopwith design. Sunbeam had produced 647 aircraft of various types by the time the lines shut down in early 1919.

End of an era and sale to Darracq
Marston's third son, Roland, had been expected to take over as chairman of Sunbeam but he suddenly died in March 1918 and John Marston himself died the morning after Roland's funeral. He was aged 82. Cureton was already in poor health and would die in 1921. They had made Coatalen a joint managing director in 1914 alongside William Marklew Iliff (1873–1957).

S.T.D. Motors

In June 1920 Darracq bought Wolverhampton's Sunbeam Motor Car Company Limited. In 1919, following the First World War, Darracq had bought a London motor manufacturer, Clément-Talbot. The Sunbeam Talbot and Darracq businesses retained their separate identities. The Sunbeam car would continue to be made at Moorfield Works, Wolverhampton, the Talbot in North Kensington and the Darracq at Suresnes with central buying, selling, administration and advertising departments with S T D in Britain On 13 August 1920 Darracq changed its name to S T D Motors Limited. The initials represented Sunbeam, Talbot and Darracq.

S.T.D. Motors Limited had been first incorporated in London in 1905, at that time bearing the name A Darracq and Company (1905) Limited, though it continued to manufacture its Darracq cars in Suresnes, Paris.

S T D Motors Limited group in 1924
 Clement-Talbot Limited: Talbot cars
 Darracq Motor Engineering Company Limited: motorcar bodies and assembly of French-sourced Talbot components for sale in the British market as Darracq-Talbot cars.
 Sunbeam Motor Car Company Limited: Sunbeam cars
 Jonas Woodhead & Sons Limited: automobile springs
in France
 Automobiles Talbot SA: Talbot cars (until 1921 named Automobiles Darracq SA: Darracq cars)
 Darracq Proprietary Company Limited: held those French assets not held by Automobiles Talbot SA
other investments
 W & G Du Cros Limited: Yellow Taxi-cabs, charabanc and bus bodies, motorcar bodies and assembly of French-sourced Talbot components for sale in the British market as Darracq-Talbot cars.
 Heenan & Froude Limited, constructional engineers

Closedown and sale of brandname
Sunbeam did not survive the Great Depression. It fell into receivership in 1934 and was sold by the receiver to the Rootes brothers.

Products

Production cars
When at its height in the 1920s, Sunbeam Motor Car Company's Moorfield works employed 3,500 staff on their 50-acre site. The buildings covered 15 acres.

Under VSCC rules all cars made in Wolverhampton post WW1 qualify as vintage and as post-vintage thoroughbreds after 1 January 1931. All cars built before the end of the First World War are covered by the VCC.

Coatalen's obsession with improvement meant that there were numerous small changes in models from year to year. Therefore, although his designs are basically similar, few parts are interchangeable. Two models dominated production:
 1920–24 16 hp, 16/40, 24 hp, 24/60 and 24/70 all based on pre-war designs
 1922–23 14 hp, the first post-war four-cylinder
 1924 12/30 and 16/50 only produced in small numbers
 1924–26 14/40 and big brother 20/60 developed from 14 hp with two more cylinders added.
 1926–30   3-litre Super Sports, Sunbeam's Bentley rival.
 1926–30 16 hp (known as "16.9") and 20 hp (known as "20.9"). Two new designs with six-cylinder integral cast iron block and crankcase. Both were produced over many years. The 20.9 with a 3-litre engine producing 70 bhp shared components with the 3-litre Super Sports (brakes, suspension, steering, axles, gearbox, transmission).
 1926–32 20/60 developed into 25 hp with bore increased from 75 to 80 mm. A few 8-cylinder cars produced in this period, 30 hp & 35 hp.
 1930–32 16 hp bore increased from 67 to 70 mm, (known as "18.2").
 1931–33 New model 20 hp (known as "23.8") introduced with 80 mm bore and 7 main bearings rated at 23.8 hp.
 1933–34 New model Speed 20 consisting of 20.9 hp engine resurrected with improved exhaust manifold and downdraught carb installed in new cruciform braced chassis.
 1933 18.2 hp engine installed in Speed 20 chassis and renamed 'Twenty'.
 1933–35 Twenty-Five introduced with modified 1931–33 23.8 hp engine.
 1934 Twenty given the 20.9 engine in place of the 18.2.
 1934–35 Dawn introduced. 12.8 engine and IFS.
 1935 Speed 20 renamed Sports 21 with redesigned body style.
 1935 Sports 21 given a high compression version of Twenty-Five engine.

The most successful, judged by volumes, was the 16 hp (16.9) followed by 20 hp (20.9) made from 1926 to 1930.

Sunbeam built their own bodies but also supplied to the coachbuilder trade; many limousines were built on Sunbeam chassis. The sales catalogue illustrates the standard body designs.

Financial difficulties arose in the early years of the Great Depression and just before the opening of the October 1934 Olympia Motor Show an application was made to the court for an appointment of a receiver and manager for the two major subsidiaries of S T D, Sunbeam and Automobiles Talbot France. Clément-Talbot remained profitable and was sold to the Rootes brothers. It proved impossible for the directors to avoid the appointment of a receiver to Sunbeam Motor Car Company and S T D was unable to complete its sale to Rootes. However six months later in July 1935 Rootes Securities announced they had bought Sunbeam Motor Car Company and its subsidiary Sunbeam Commercial Vehicles.

The following cars were built by Sunbeam Motor Car Company Limited.

Commercial vehicles

Buses
Car production was terminated but trolleybus production continued. Karrier's trolleybus business was moved from Huddersfield to Moorfield (not Luton with other Karrier operations) and combined with Sunbeam but the same Karrier designs were to be produced. During wartime the factory produced the only trolleybus available in the UK; a four-wheeled double decker known as either the Karrier or Sunbeam W4.

In 1946 soon after the end of the Second World War J. Brockhouse and Co Limited of West Bromwich, the engineering group, bought Sunbeam Commercial Vehicles but in September 1948 sold the trolley-bus part of the business to Guy Motors Limited. who built Sunbeam trolleybuses at their factory until the last was completed in 1964.

Double decker buses
 Sikh 1930–1933 (three built)
 Pathan 1930–1938 (at least four built for Woverhampton Corp)
 DF2 1936–1948 (one built for Wolverhampton Corp)

Double decker trolleybuses
 MS2 1934–1948
 MS3 1934–1948
 MF1 1934–1949
 MF2 1935–1952
 W4 1943–1947
 F4/F4A 1948–1965
 S7/S7A 1948–1958

Double or single-deck trolleybus
 MF2B 1934–65
Brisbane City Council (Australia) imported Sunbeam single-deck trolleybus chassis from 1951 until 1960.  All had been withdrawn by 1969. Two of these, fleet numbers 1 (of 1951, with a body by Charles Hope of Brisbane) and 34 (of 1960, body by Athol Hedges), are preserved at the Brisbane Tramway Museum.

Sunbeam-Coatalen aero engines

Sunbeam, Wolverhampton, England, started to build aircraft engines in 1912. Louis Coatalen joined Sunbeam as chief engineer in 1909, having previously been Chief Engineer at the Humber works in Coventry. The company quickly became one of the UK's leading engine manufacturers and even designed an aircraft of its own. Sunbeam discontinued the production of aero engines after Coatalen left the company in the 1930s.
 Sunbeam Crusader V8, 
 Sunbeam Zulu V8, developed from Crusader
 Sunbeam Mohawk V12, 
 Sunbeam Gurkha V12, developed from Maori
 Sunbeam Cossack V12, 18.4 litres
 Sunbeam Nubian V8, 7.7 litres
 Sunbeam Afridi V12, 11.476 litres
 Sunbeam Maori V12, 14.7 litres, developed from Afridi
 Sunbeam Amazon Straight-6, 9.2 litres, developed from Cossack
 Sunbeam Saracen Straight-6, 11.2 litres, developed from Amazon
 Sunbeam Viking W18 "Broad Arrow" , 33.6 litres, developed from Cossack
 Sunbeam Arab V8, 11.8 litres
 Sunbeam Bedouin inverted V8, 12.3 litres, developed from Arab
 Sunbeam Manitou V12, 14.7 litres, developed from Maori
 Sunbeam Tartar V12, 15.4 litres
 Sunbeam Kaffir W12 "Broad Arrow" , developed from Arab, 18.3 litres
 Sunbeam Spartan V12, 14 litres, air-cooled
 Sunbeam Matabele V12, 22.4 litres, developed from Cossack
 Sunbeam Malay Five-pointed star arrangement of 20 cylinders, 29.4 litres
 Sunbeam Pathan Straight-6, 8.8 litres, diesel
 Sunbeam Dyak Straight-6, 8.8 litres
 Sunbeam Sikh V12, 64.1 litres
 Sunbeam Sikh II
 Sunbeam Sikh III
 Sunbeam 2,000hp

Grand Prix cars

Sunbeam's great era was in the 1920s under Coatalen's leadership with well-engineered, high quality, reliable cars and a great reputation on the track.

Coatalen was pleased to build racing cars for Henry Segrave, who won the French and Spanish GPs in 1923/4. In 1921 Segrave participated in his first Grand Prix on Talbot no.10, in effect a re-badged 1921 Grand Prix Sunbeam. This important straight-eight dohc, four valve per cylinder aluminium block car influenced by the great designer Ernest Henry proceeded to win the 1922 Tourist Trophy in the hands of Jean Chassagne.

A different team of 2-litre dohc 1922 Grand Prix Sunbeams designed by Ernest Henry were entered in that year's French Grand Prix.

World land speed record cars

He also built a Brooklands racer with a purpose-built V12 18.3-litre engine whose design was a hybrid of the Sunbeam Manitou and the Sunbeam Arab aero engines. This engine had four blocks of three cylinders arranged in two banks set at 60 degrees (unlike the Arab which were set at 90 degrees). Each cylinder had one inlet and two exhaust valves actuated by a single overhead camshaft. The two camshafts were driven by a complex set of 16 gears from the front of the crankshaft – a similar arrangement to that used on the Maori engine which had two OHC per bank of cylinders. This famous car (Sunbeam 350HP) established three Land Speed Records, the first achieved by Kenelm Lee Guinness at Brooklands in 1922 with a speed of 133.75 mph. Malcolm Campbell then purchased the car, had it painted in his distinctive colour scheme, named it Blue Bird and in September 1924 achieved a new record speed of 146.16 mph at Pendine Sands in South Wales, raising it the following year to 150.76 mph. The same year Coatalen's new 3-litre Super Sports came 2nd at Le Mans, beating Bentley – this was the first production twin-cam car in the world. In 1926 Segrave captured the LSR in a new 4-litre V12 Sunbeam racer originally named Ladybird and later renamed Tiger. Coatalen decided to re-enter the LSR field himself, building the truly gigantic Sunbeam 1000HP powered by two  Matabele engines. The car is now at the National Motor Museum, Beaulieu, UK.

A later land speed record attempt, with the 1930 Silver Bullet, failed to achieve either records, or the hoped-for advances in aero engines. It is now almost forgotten.

Commemoration

The name lives on in the open space known as Sunbeam Gardens near a housing estate built in the early 1990s on most of the Ladbroke Grove site of the Clément-Talbot car factory. One of the original buildings remains, the Talbot administration block now known as Ladbroke Hall, with the earl's crest high above its main entrance. In the housing area there is a Sunbeam Crescent.

Sunbeam as a badge for other manufacturers

Rootes Group

Rootes was an early proponent of badge engineering, building a single mass-produced chassis and equipping it with different body panels and interiors to fit different markets. They ended production of existing models at all the new companies, replacing them with designs from Hillman and Humber that were more amenable to mass production.

Although Rootes' intention had been to continue the Sunbeam name on a large and expensive luxury car, the eight-cylinder Sunbeam 30, after almost four years it was announced Sunbeam Motors and Clement-Talbot were now combined under the ownership of Clement Talbot Limited – since renamed Sunbeam-Talbot Limited – and would produce good quality cars at reasonable prices. During 1937 Humber Limited bought Clement Talbot Limited and Sunbeam Motors Limited from Rootes Securities Limited.

In 1938 Rootes created a new marque called Sunbeam-Talbot which combined the quality Talbot coachwork and the current Hillman and Humber chassis and was assembled at the Talbot factory in London. The initial two models were the Sunbeam-Talbot 10 and the 3-litre followed by the Sunbeam-Talbot 2 Litre and 4-litre models based on the earlier models only with different engines and longer wheelbases. Production of these models continued after the war until 1948.

In the summer of 1948, the Sunbeam-Talbot 80 and Sunbeam-Talbot 90 were introduced, with a totally new streamlined design with flowing front fenders (wings). The 80 used the Hillman Minx-based engine with ohv and the 90 used a modified version of the Humber Hawk with ohv. The car bodies were manufactured by another Rootes Group company, British Light Steel Pressings of Acton, however the convertible drophead coupé shells were completed by Thrupp & Maberly coachbuilders in Cricklewood. The underpowered 80 was discontinued in 1950. The 90 was renamed the 90 Mark II and then the 90 Mark IIA and eventually in 1954 the Sunbeam Mark III, finally dropping the Talbot name. With the model name changes, the headlights were raised on the front fenders and an independent coil front suspension and the engine displacement went from 1944 cc to 2267 cc with a high compression head and developing .

There was one more model of the Sunbeam-Talbot that appeared in 1953 in the form of an Alpine, a two-seater sports roadster which was initially developed by a Sunbeam-Talbot dealer George Hartwell in Bournemouth as a one-off rally car that had its beginnings as a 1952 drophead coupé. It was named supposedly by Norman Garrad, (works Competition Department) who was heavily involved in the Sunbeam-Talbot successes in the Alpine Rally in the early 1950s using the Saloon model. The Alpine Mark I and Mark III (a Mark II was never made) were hand built like the Drophead Coupé at Thrupp & Maberly coachbuilders from 1953 to 1955 when production ceased after close to 3000 were produced. It has been estimated that perhaps only 200 remain in existence today. The Talbot name was dropped in 1954 for the Sunbeam Alpine sports car, making Sunbeam the sports-performance marque. In 1955 a Sunbeam saloon won the Monte Carlo Rally. Production ceased in 1956 and was replaced by the sporty Sunbeam Rapier.

In 1959 a totally new Alpine was introduced, and the 1955 Rapier (essentially a badge-engineered Hillman Minx) was upgraded. After several successful series of the Alpine were released, director of US West-Coast operations, Ian Garrad, became interested in the success of the AC Cobra, which mounted a small-block V-8 engine in the small AC Ace frame to create one of the most successful sports cars of all time. Garrad became convinced the Alpine frame could also be adapted the same way, and contracted Carroll Shelby to create a prototype with a Ford engine. The result was the Sunbeam Tiger, released in 1964, which became a success. It sold 7,000 units in its 3 years of production compared with 70,000 over 9 years for the small-engined car.

Chrysler Europe
But at this point, Rootes was in financial trouble. Talks with Leyland Motors were fruitless. In 1964, 30 percent of the company (along with 50 percent of the non-voting shares) was purchased by Chrysler, who was attempting to enter the European market. Ironically, Chrysler had purchased Simca the year earlier, who had earlier purchased Automobiles Talbot, originally the British brand that had been merged into STD Motors many years earlier.

Chrysler's experience with the Rootes empire appears to have been unhappy. Models were abandoned over the next few years while they tried to build a single brand from the best models of each of the company's components. For management, "best" typically meant "cheapest to produce," which was at odds with the former higher-quality Rootes philosophy. Brand loyalty began to erode, and was greatly damaged when they decided to drop former marques and start calling everything a Chrysler. The Tiger was dropped in 1967 after an abortive attempt to fit it with a Chrysler engine, and the Hillman Imp–derived Stiletto disappeared in 1972.

The last Sunbeam produced was the "Rootes Arrow" series Alpine/Rapier fastback (1967–76), after which Chrysler, who had purchased Rootes, disbanded the marque. The Hillman (by now Chrysler) Hunter, on which they were based, soldiered on until 1978.

A Hillman Avenger-derived hatchback, the Chrysler Sunbeam, maintained the Sunbeam name, as a model rather than a marque, from 1977. Following the takeover of Chrysler Europe by PSA Group, the model was branded as the Talbot Sunbeam from 1979 through to its discontinuation in 1981. The Sunbeam name has not been used on a production car since then.

Factory locations and models produced

Barlby Road Kensington London
 1936–1937 Sunbeam 30 prototypes
 1936–1938 Talbot Ten
 1938–1946 Sunbeam-Talbot Ten
 1939–1946 Sunbeam-Talbot Two Litre
 1938–1940 Sunbeam-Talbot Three Litre
 1939–1940 Sunbeam-Talbot Four Litre

Ryton-on-Dunsmore
Sunbeam-Talbot
 1946–1948 Sunbeam-Talbot Ten
 1946–1948 Sunbeam-Talbot Two Litre
 1948–1950 Sunbeam-Talbot 80
 1948–1954 Sunbeam-Talbot 90 Marks I, II & IIA
 1954–1957 Sunbeam 90 Mark III
Sunbeam
 1953–1955 Sunbeam Alpine Mark I,III
 1955–1967 Sunbeam Rapier Series I, II, III, IIIA, IV & V
 1959–1968 Sunbeam Alpine Series I, II, III, III, IV & V
 1964–1967 Sunbeam Tiger
 1967–1970 Sunbeam Rapier Fastback & Sunbeam Alpine Fastback

Ryton-on-Dunsmore export-only
 Sunbeam Minx
 Sunbeam Vogue/Sunbeam Arrow
 Sunbeam Funwagon/Sunbeam Highwayman

Linwood
 1966–1976 Sunbeam Imp Sport
 1967–1972 Sunbeam Stiletto
 1970–1976 Sunbeam Rapier Fastback & Sunbeam Alpine Fastback
 1977–1979 Chrysler Sunbeam (model name only)
 1979–1981 Talbot Sunbeam (model name only)

Stoke
 1982–1982 Sunbeam Lotus-Horizon (One-off prototype rally car)

Milan, Italy
 1963–1964 Sunbeam Venezia body by Carrozzeria Touring:  only 145 produced

In popular culture
P. G. Wodehouse in Carry on, Jeeves (1922) wrote "...A Sunbeam, isn't it? We've got a Wolseley at home."
Agatha Christie's character, Horace Blatt, drives a Sunbeam, the only automobile make mentioned in Evil under the Sun (1941).
 Elizabeth Taylor's character drives a red Series I Sunbeam Alpine in BUtterfield 8 (1960).
 James Bond drives a lake blue Series II Sunbeam Alpine in Dr. No (1962).
 Michael Caine's character drives a Sunbeam Alpine in Gambit (1966). Caine is also rescued by a woman in a white 1968 Alpine roadster in Get Carter (1971).
 Tuesday Weld's character drives a powder blue 1967 Sunbeam Alpine in Pretty Poison (1968).
 Maxwell Smart drove a Sunbeam Tiger in Get Smart.
 Nancy Drew inherited a Sunbeam Tiger in Nancy Drew (2019 TV series).

See also
 List of car manufacturers of the United Kingdom
 Sunbeam S7 and S8
 Sunbeamland

References

External links

Example of Sunbeam Sikh bus
Sunbeam Talbot Alpine Register (STAR)
 Sunbeam Talbot Darracq Register Ltd private archives (accessible to members)
The Sunbeam Talbot Darracq Register Ltd

The Supreme Sunbeam
 

 
Car manufacturers of the United Kingdom
Defunct motor vehicle manufacturers of England
British brands
Defunct aircraft engine manufacturers of the United Kingdom
Former defence companies of the United Kingdom
United Kingdom in World War I
Trolleybus manufacturers
Defunct bus manufacturers of the United Kingdom
Luxury motor vehicle manufacturers
Vehicle manufacturing companies established in 1905
Vehicle manufacturing companies disestablished in 1976
1905 establishments in England
1976 disestablishments in England
British companies established in 1905
British companies disestablished in 1976
S T D Motors
Rootes Group